São João del-Rei is a Brazilian municipality in the state of Minas Gerais. Founded in 1713 in homage to King John V of Portugal, the city is famed for its historic Portuguese colonial architecture. The current population is estimated at 93,778 inhabitants.

Geography 
It is located in the drainage basin of the Rio Grande and its terrain is located in the Mantiqueira mountains. It is a centre for the cities in the south and southeast of Minas Gerais.

The municipality contains part of the Ritápolis National Forest.

According to the modern (2017) geographic classification by Brazil's National Institute of Geography and Statistics (IBGE), the municipality belongs to the Immediate Geographic Region of São João del-Rei, in the Intermediate Geographic Region of Barbacena.

Districts 
The municipality has five rural districts.

 Rio das Mortes 
 São Gonçalo do Amarante 
 São Miguel do Cajuru 
 Emboabas 
 São Sebastião da Vitória

History 

The city was founded by the bandeirantes; Tomé Portes del-Rei is considered the city's founder. The original small village situated in southern Minas Gerais was created as a staging post on the Estrada Real, a trade route from the coast at Paraty to cities in the central region of Minas Gerais such as Ouro Preto, Mariana and Conselheiro Lafaiete. Later huge amounts of gold were found near the city itself.

Culture 
Today, São João del-Rei is a university town. The campus of the Federal University of São João del-Rei (UFSJ) and a number of other educational institutions are present in the city. A second medical school is to be established at the University.

The city has many famous religious festivals through the year, most of them preserving the way it was celebrated by the time of the foundation, with baroque music and special celebrations that attracts tourists from all over the world, particularly during Holy Week, when the town receives the greatest influx of visitors.

Tourism 
The city is 12 km from Tiradentes. Other historical cities in Minas Gerais are Ouro Preto, Diamantina, Mariana, Congonhas and Sabará.

Cathedrals and churches 
 Catedral Basílica Nossa Senhora do Pilar (1721), a Minor Basilica, dedicated to Our Lady of the Pillar, the episcopal seat of the Roman Catholic Diocese of São João del Rei.
 Our Lady of Rosário (1720)
 Our Lady of Carmo (1733)
 Our Lady of Mercês e Bonfim (1769)
 São Francisco de Assis (1774)
 Santo Antônio (Senhor dos Montes neighborhood)
 Nossa Senhora da Piedade do Bom Despacho

Sports 
The city is home to Athletic Club (1909), an association football team that plays in the First Division of Campeonato Mineiro, along with Cruzeiro, Atlético and América.

Notable people

Folk 
 Tiradentes, national hero

Sports 
 Thiago Galhardo, association football professional player

Entrepreneur 
 Nadir Dias de Figueiredo, glass industrialist

Writers 

 Otto Lara Resende, writer (chronicler)
 Bárbara Heliodora, writer and thinker from Inconfidência Mineira

Music 
 Chico Lobo, composer of viola caipira

Politicians 

 Tancredo Neves, former president of Brazil
 Manuel Jacinto Nogueira da Gama, Imperial senator

Catholic Church 

Blessed Francisca de Paula de Jesus, Afro-Brazilian Catholic laywoman
 Antônio de Almeida Lustosa, Archbishop of Fortaleza, Servant of God
 Lucas Moreira Neves, Catholic cardinal
 Miguel Afonso de Andrade Leite, Catholic priest, Servant of God
 José Maria Xavier, sacred music composer and Catholic priest

Estrada de Ferro Oeste de Minas 
São João del-Rei was an important station on the Estrada de Ferro Oeste de Minas, a narrow gauge railway characterised by woodburning steam locomotives, and the location of a major roundhouse. The station and surrounding facilities have been turned into Brazil's largest railway museum, and a tourist railway operates from the station to the well preserved colonial town of Tiradentes.

References

External links 

  Guia Turistico e Histórico de São João Del Rei
  Municipal website
 Guia del Rei

Municipalities in Minas Gerais